KWTM (90.9 FM) was a radio station broadcasting a Religious format, licensed to June Lake, California, United States. KWTM was a part of a quadrocast with KWTW in Bishop, California, KWTD in Ridgecrest, California, and KWTH in Barstow, California, known the Living Proof Radio Network, which is a ministry of Calvary Chapel in Bishop. The station was owned by Living Proof Inc.

KWTM's license was cancelled by the Federal Communications Commission on October 10, 2018, due to the station having been silent since March 18, 2017.

External links
KWTM website

Radio stations established in 2002
2002 establishments in California
Defunct radio stations in the United States
Radio stations disestablished in 2018
2018 disestablishments in California
Defunct religious radio stations in the United States
WTM
WTM